Žitavce, formerly Žitavské Ďarmoty is a village and municipality in the Nitra District in western central Slovakia, in the Nitra Region.

History
In historical records the village was first mentioned in 1232.

Geography
The village lies at an altitude of 141 metres and covers an area of 8.288 km². It has a population of about 330 people.

Ethnicity
The population is about 97% Slovak.

References

Villages and municipalities in Nitra District